Caio Fábio Gabriel Quiroga (born 7 June 1994), commonly known as Caio Quiroga, is a Brazilian footballer who plays as a midfielder, most recently for Votuporanguense

Career
Quiroga left Covilhã on 26 January 2019 by mutual consent.

Career statistics

Club

Notes

References

External links
Caio Quiroga at ZeroZero

1998 births
Living people
Brazilian footballers
Brazilian expatriate footballers
Association football midfielders
CR Flamengo footballers
Agremiação Sportiva Arapiraquense players
Ituano FC players
Luverdense Esporte Clube players
S.C. Covilhã players
Clube Atlético Votuporanguense players
Campeonato Brasileiro Série B players
Liga Portugal 2 players
Brazilian expatriate sportspeople in Portugal
Expatriate footballers in Portugal
Footballers from Rio de Janeiro (city)